Lycée Français Jacques Prévert is a French international school in Saly, Senegal. It serves levels primaire (primary school) through lycée (senior high school/sixth form).

References

External links
  Le site du Lycée Français Jacques Prévert à Saly, Sénégal

International schools in Senegal
French international schools in Africa